La Trinidad, officially the Municipality of La Trinidad, is a 1st class municipality and capital of the province of Benguet, Philippines. According to the 2020 census, it has a population of 137,404 people.

The municipality is known for its strawberry plantations earning the title "Strawberry Fields of the Philippines".

La Trinidad is within Metro Baguio area. The town's name comes from the Spanish phrase for "The Trinity"

History

Spanish period
The valley encompassing La Trinidad was originally called "Benguet", a thriving community of Ibaloi migrants from Tinek. Natives traded local products, which included gold, with nearby lowland towns that had Dominican and Augustinian missions established. About 1616, the procurator general of Manila, Hemando de los Rios Coronel became interested in the mountain gold and proposed to the Spanish King to expedite its search. He wrote both Alonso Fajardo, the Governor of Manila, and the Archbishop of Manila in December 1618 that it was the solution to both the abandoned missions as well as the depleted colonial treasury. Fajardo requested feedback from the religious orders on this matter; whether waging a war against the Igorots was just. Only the Jesuits objected with the war, preferring only that their "mines be occupied in the name of his Majesty".

In 1620, Fajardo sent the first expedition under Captain Garcia Aldana y Cabrera, Governor of Pangasinan. Aldana and his men took the route from Aringay, crossing the Naguilian River to Duplas (La Union), then followed the Bornotan (Santo Rosario) River eventually reaching Takdian. Upon arriving at the mining community of Bua, the men found only a recently burned village, suggesting the natives fled with nothing for them to plunder. Aldana examined the Antamok mines and was able to gather some gold.

A second expedition was sent in 1623 under the command of Sergeant Major Antonio Carreño de Valdes. Carreño was able to repel some Igorot assaults, building two forts; 'Fort Santiago' overlooking the present Santo Nino mines, and 'Fort del Rosario' in the Antamok-Itogon area. The Igorots submitted to Spanish authorities only to strike back when the rainy season made it difficult to send manpower and new supplies, prompting the Spaniards to retreat.

Finally, in 1624, Fajardo sent Captain Alonso Martin Quirante, a master of strategy, logistics and tactics. In February of that year, Quirante took off with a huge expedition of 1,903 soldiers, carpenters, miners, smiths, slaves, clerks and some requisite clergy. He divided his large force into three; the first to clear the road, the second to follow, and the third with rations and arms. This ensured they would reach the mining area after clearing out an Igorot fort along the way. Quirante was able to reach the mining areas, and discovered about two hundred abandoned houses, implying the locals fled beforehand. He rebuilt Fort Santiago, and examined five mines; four of which showed signs of having been abandoned by the Igorots: Arisey Bugayona, Baranaban, Antamog, and Conog. The fifth mine called Galan was still operational. Quirante ordered baskets of ore gathered from each mine, labeled and ready for assaying. The results showed no evidence of deposits rich enough to yield attractive profit, prompting Quirante to return to Manila with 400 baskets of ore to be sent to Mexico for further assaying.

Meanwhile, the Royal Audiencia had become concerned at the expense of the project which had already cost 33,982 pesos. Don Geronimo Silva took over the government, convening the council to decide on the issue. The Royal Audiencia decided to abandon the project because of mounting expenses, loss of life and the continued hostility of the Igorots and their land.

In 1829, another expedition was sent to Benguet under Guillermo Galvey.

Although the District of Benguet was established in La Trinidad by 1846, it was only on April 21, 1874, under Commandant Manuel Scheidnagel, that "Valle de Benguet" was renamed "Valle de La Trinidad" (La Trinidad Valley). Despite popular acceptance that it was named as "a fitting tribute to Galvey’s wife - Doña Trinidad de Galvey" – recent research has revealed that credit should have probably gone to Scheidnagel, having been inspired by the three prominent adjacent hills (in effect, forming a Trinity: a religious icon of the Christian campaign) overlooking the Poblacion church, where the seat of government, the Cabecera, was established.

Together with 40 other smaller surrounding rancherías, La Trinidad was placed under the jurisdiction of the newly established Benguet commandancia politico-militar in 1846 and was established as its administrative headquarters during the Spanish Conquest of the Philippines.

American period

During the Philippine Revolution, in July 1898, Filipino revolutionary forces under the Ibaloi chieftain Juan Cariño and Pedro Paterno liberated La Trinidad from the Spaniards and took over the government, proclaiming Benguet as a province of the new Philippine Republic, with La Trinidad as its capital.

In 1900, the American colonizers arrived, and La Trinidad was established as one of the 19 townships under Benguet province, upon the issuance of Act No. 48. For a brief period, Baguio became the capital of Benguet when appointed Benguet province civil governor H.P. Whitmarsh moved the seat of government from La Trinidad to Baguio in 1901. La Trinidad was made the provincial capital again in 1909, after the Baguio township was abolished and converted into a chartered city.

Second World War

On May 3, 1945, The Filipino soldiers of the 2nd, 12th, 13th, 15th and 16th Infantry Division of the Philippine Commonwealth Army, 1st Constabulary Regiment of the Philippine Constabulary, and the 66th Infantry Regiment of the United States Armed Forces in the Philippines - Northern Luzon or USAFIP-NL liberated La Trinidad.

Modern history

La Trinidad was transformed into a full-fledged town from its former status as municipal district by virtue of Republic Act No. 531, approved June 16, 1950.

On June 23, 2016, La Trinidad was highlighted in the media when the first and largest community artwork in the Philippines, the STOBOSA Hillside Homes Artwork was unveiled, featuring hillside houses within the sitios of Stonehill, Botiwtiw and Sadjap of Barangay Balili painted with sunflower and abstract designs.

Today, people often hear about the town's push for cityhood. The town had long surpassed the requirements for annual income, but could not comply with either of the minimum population or land area requirements of at least 150,000 inhabitants or a contiguous territory of 100 square kilometers, as mandated by the Local Government Code.

Cityhood

House Bill No. 6367 was filed last February 20, 2020, for the conversion of the municipality of La Trinidad into a component city in the province of Benguet. The bill is currently pending with the committee on local government since February 26, 2020.

Geography

It is bounded by Tublay on the north-east, Sablan on the west, Baguio on the south, Itogon on the southeast, and Tuba on the south-west.

According to the Philippine Statistics Authority, the municipality has a land area of  constituting  of the  total area of Benguet.

The terrain is generally mountainous with springs, rivers and creeks. The town has a valley which encompasses several barangays.

The Balili River is the municipality's main water drainage which carries upstream water from the Sagudin River in Baguio. The river merges with another upstream river in Tuel upon reaching the La Trinidad-Tublay-Sablan tri-point.

Climate

La Trinidad has a dry-winter subtropical highland climate (Köppen climate classification: Cwb), featuring a menacing wet season.

La Trinidad belongs under the Type I climate by the Coronas System of classification with distinct wet and dry seasons. The dry season is from November to April while the wet season occurs during the rest of the year. Wind velocity is 1.43.

Barangays
La Trinidad is politically subdivided into 16 barangays., with 11 classified as urban and 5 as rural. As of 2015, the most populous is Pico with 23,282 people, while Bineng, with 1,624 people, has the least. Wangal is the largest in terms of land area, while Cruz is the smallest. Balili was the most densely populated, and Bineng was the least. Bineng has the most number of sitios, while Betag has the least with only 4.

These barangays are headed by elected officials: Barangay Captain, Barangay Council, whose members are called Barangay Councilors. All are elected every three years.

Demographics

In the 2020 census, La Trinidad had a population of 137,404.

Economy 

La Trinidad supplies most of the Philippines' strawberries and cut flowers which include roses. The La Trinidad Vegetable Trading Post is visited by wholesalers and traders of vegetables from other provinces. The presence of the Benguet State University in the municipality serves as a boost to agricultural research and development in the region.

Its proximity to the city of Baguio attracts tourists, primarily to the strawberry fields in the valley, and lesser to the Benguet Provincial Capitol and the Rose Gardens of barangay Bahong.

Government

La Trinidad, belonging to the lone congressional district of the province of Benguet, is governed by a mayor designated as its local chief executive and by a municipal council as its legislative body in accordance with the Local Government Code. The mayor, vice mayor, and the councilors are elected directly by the people through an election which is being held every three years.

Elected officials

Education

La Trinidad, aside from the adjacent city of Baguio, is the center of higher education in Benguet province.

Public schools
As of 2014, La Trinidad has 23 public elementary schools and 7 public secondary schools.

The main campus of the Benguet State University, the first university in the province, is located in the municipality.

Private schools
There are 11 private schools according to the Department of Education - Schools Division of Benguet.

 BVS Colleges
 Cordillera Career Development College
 HML International College
 H.O.P.E. Christian Academy, Inc.
 King's College of the Philippines
 Little Flower Children's Home Foundation
 Northskills Polytechnic College, Inc.
 Philippine College of Ministry
 Philippine Nazarene College
 Rainbow Mission International Academy, Inc.
 San Jose School of La Trinidad, Inc.
 Star Colleges

Notable personalities
La Trinidad is the burial place of:
 Deodato Arellano (1844–1899), a Filipino patriot and one of the founders of the Katipunan.

Sister cities

Local
 Danao, Bohol
 Quezon City

International

  Hitachiōta, Ibaraki, Japan
  Jincheon County, South Korea
  Laemrung, Thailand
  Minamimaki, Nagano, Japan
  Miyako, Iwate, Japan
  Tamuning, Guam, USA

See also
La Trinidad Strawberry Farm

Notes

References

External links

 
 [ Philippine Standard Geographic Code]

Municipalities of Benguet
Provincial capitals of the Philippines